The 98th Infantry Division was created on 18 September 1939 in Grafenwöhr. It was destroyed on the Crimea in May 1944 and reformed on 5 June 1944.

Commanding officers 
 Generalleutnant Erich Schröck, 1 September 1939 – 11 April 1940
 Generalleutnant Herbert Stimmel, 11 April 1940 – 10 June 1940
 Generalleutnant Erich Schröck, 10 June 1940 – 31 December 1941
 General der Infanterie Martin Gareis, 31 December 1941 – 1 February 1944
 Generalleutnant Alfred-Hermann Reinhardt, 1 February 1944 – 11 April 1945
 Generalmajor Otto Schiel, 11 April 1945 – 8 May 1945

References 
Citations

Bibliography

Military units and formations established in 1939
0*098
1939 establishments in Germany
Military units and formations disestablished in 1945